Sharon Dunn (born in Sydney, Nova Scotia) is a Canadian journalist.

Career
A graduate of Dalhousie University, she began her career in broadcasting at the age of 21 as a weather girl at CJCB-TV in Sydney, Nova Scotia in 1975. She quickly moved to CBC Halifax where she was hired as the 6 o‘clock news anchor, and from there became the anchor at CBC’s flagship station, CBLT in Toronto for Newshour (earning the highest ratings that station had ever recorded).

Dunn also hosted CBC-TV’s Newsfinal, and Reach for the Top. Dunn left CBC to have her first child, and became a columnist for the National Post interviewing such celebrities as Woody Harrelson, Suzanne Somers, Ivana Trump, Johnny Cochrane, Margaret Atwood, and Johnny Depp.

Dunn also wrote stories for Reader's Digest and Maclean's magazine (her article about her son's scoliosis (Amazing Brace, MacLean's ), was a finalist in the Health and Science category for the 2008 National Magazine Awards). She has also been syndicated by The New York Times.

Dunn’s husband was renowned horse breeder, John Sikura, who died in 1994. They have two sons.

Personal life
Dunn is currently a writer living in Toronto, Ontario. She was in a much publicized relationship with Mike Harris when he was premier of Ontario.

References

External links
Sharon Dunn's Website

Canadian columnists
Dalhousie University alumni
People from Sydney, Nova Scotia
Living people
Canadian women television journalists
Canadian women columnists
1954 births